Sarmato is a comune (municipality) in the Province of Piacenza in the Italian region Emilia-Romagna, located about  northwest of Bologna and about  west of Piacenza.
Sarmato borders the following municipalities: Borgonovo Val Tidone, Castel San Giovanni, Monticelli Pavese, Pieve Porto Morone, Rottofreno.

Geography 
The town and its municipal area are located in Po valley, at right riverside of Po river and low Tidone valley. The municipality is situated at north-west area of province of Piacenza and it borders with province of Pavia in Lombardy. Sarmato borders the following municipalities: Castel San Giovanni, Borgonovo Val Tidone, Rottofreno, Pieve Porto Morone (PV) and Monticelli Pavese (PV).

The municipal area includes main town and also following boroughs: Agazzino, Cà dell’Acqua, Casoni, Cepone, Coste di Sotto, Madonna del Rosario, Nosone, Ponte Tidone, Salumificio and Veratto. Near Veratto, Tidone river flows into Po river.

Climate 
Sarmato belongs to climate zone E. It has a continental climate with hot and wet summer, and cold and wet winter. During fall and winter, fog is often frequently present.

History

Economy 
The municipal territory is flat area and there are a lot of small creeks that provide plentiful irrigation. Thanks to these opportune features, the main economy activity is agriculture. The principal plantations are: cereals (mainly wheat and mais), fodder and vegetables (especially tomato). An important branch is zootechnics, especially bovine farming. Regarding industries, there are advanced food factories, building factories, metalworking factories and factories that produce glass, plastic and rubber. Tertiary sector is composed of small network of stores, services and banks. Every Friday morning there is a weekly market.

Education 
There are a nursery school, a play group, a primary school and a secondary school. Inside of secondary school building there is a municipal library (it handles books, newspapers, magazines and DVDs).

Transportation 

The Padana Inferiore state road crosses the municipal area, and it is the main access way.

Sarmato is on bus line Piacenza-Nibbiano Caminata served by SETA.

Railway station is located on line Alessandria-Piacenza.

The A21 Torino Piacenza highway crosses the municipal area. The closet tool booth highway is tool booth of Castel San Giovanni (located on A21 highway) and it is distant almost 8 km.

The closet main airports are Malpensa, Linate e Orio al Serio.

Between 1893 and 1938 Sarmato was on tram line Piacenza-Pianello-Nibbiano.

Demographic evolution 
Citizens recorded.

Ethnic groups 
On the date 31 December 2012 the foreign inhabitants in municipality of Sarmato are 538[6] and they represent the 18.2% of population[7]. The nations more represented are:

Government and administration 
Following table is the history of the municipal administrations.

Sport 
The soccer team of Sarmato is FCD Sarmatese that currently play in prima categoria league. The team has also youth sectors.

Sport facilities 
In Sarmato there are:
 a soccer field for 11 players (playground of FCD Sarmatese team)
 a soccer field for 7 players (near the church)
 an outdoor soccer field for 5 players (in synthetic grass)
 an outdoor basketball field
 a swimming pool with two beach volley fields
 a multipurpose gymnasium  used also for basketball and volleyball)

Notable people 
 Lotario Tomba, famous architect of neoclassical period.
 Paola Scotti, first Italian female cyclist champion.
 Giuseppe Serafini, sculptor.
 Pietro Pecchioni, soldier of Giuseppe Garibaldi's army. 
 Federico Scotti, writer and count of noble family Scotti Douglas.
 Pietro Zanardi Landi, fighter in Battle of San Martino.
 Paolo Maserati, sculptor.
 Gaetano Guglielmetti, sculptor.
 Rocco Chiapponi, mayor of Sarmato and businessman.
 Mario Bragadini, accordion musician.

References

External links
 www.comune.sarmato.pc.it/

Cities and towns in Emilia-Romagna